This is a list of years in Guyana. See also the history of Guyana.  For only articles about years in Guyana that have been written, see :Category:Years in Guyana.

21st century

20th century

19th century 

 
Guyana-related lists
History of Guyana